Whitsunday is a coastal town in the locality of Airlie Beach in the Whitsunday Region, Queensland, Australia.

History 
The town takes its name from the Whitsunday Passage which was named on 4 June 1770 by Lieutenant James Cook of HMS Endeavour because it was religious festival of Whitsun. On 31 January 1987 the town was created to encompass the whole of the urbanised area around the Whitsunday Coast, replacing the separate towns of Airlie (within the locality of Airlie Beach), Cannonvale (within the locality of the same name) and Shutehaven (within the locality of Shute Harbour) in addition to the locality of Jubilee (now Jubilee Pocket).

References

External links 
 
 Town map (western part, around Cannonvale)
 Town map (centre part, around Airlie Beach)
 Town map (eastern part, around Shute Harbour)

Whitsunday Region
Towns in Queensland